Riccardo Berardino (born 12 October 1990) is an Italian professional footballer who currently plays for Unione Calcio Bisceglie.

Biography
Born in Andria, Apulia region, Berardino started his career at Vultur Rionero, a local team in Eccellenza Basilicata (Italian sixth level until 2014). In 2008–09 season Berardino was signed by Abruzzo club Santegidiese for 2008–09 Serie D. (Italian fifth level until 2014) He moved further North for Marche club Real Montecchio in 2009–10 Serie D, however in November 2009 Berardino returned to Sant'Egidio alla Vibrata.

In 2010 Berardino was signed by Lega Pro Seconda Divisione club Chieti. The club entered 2012 promotion playoffs, losing to Paganese. Berardino was the starting attacking midfielder in 4–2–3–1 formation, after the suspension of Giuseppe Lacarra; in the first game Berardino was the substitute of Jonatan Alessandro; Berardino replaced Lorenzo Del Pinto in the second half of the last game.

In summer 2012 Berardino left for fellow Abruzzo club Teramo. On 31 January 2013 he returned to Chieti as free agent. Despite both clubs were in 2012–13 Lega Pro Seconda Divisione, Berardino only played 4 times in regular season, all for Chieti. In the playoffs Berardino was the substitute of Alessandro and starting attacking midfielder in 4–3–1–2 formation respectively. The club lost to L'Aquila in the first round, which eventually L'Aquila was the winner.

In December 2019, Berardino joined ASD Unione Calcio Bisceglie.

References

External links
 AIC profile (data by football.it) 

1990 births
People from Andria
Footballers from Apulia
Living people
Italian footballers
Association football midfielders
S.S. Chieti Calcio players
S.S. Teramo Calcio players
A.S. Melfi players
Santarcangelo Calcio players
Paganese Calcio 1926 players
A.S. Martina Franca 1947 players
S.S. Fidelis Andria 1928 players
Potenza Calcio players
Serie C players
Serie D players
Sportspeople from the Province of Barletta-Andria-Trani